The oil and gas industry is usually divided into three major components: upstream, midstream and downstream. The midstream sector involves the transportation (by pipeline, rail, barge, oil tanker or truck), storage, and wholesale marketing of crude or refined petroleum products. Pipelines and other transport systems can be used to move crude oil from production sites to refineries and deliver the various refined products to downstream distributors. Natural gas pipeline networks aggregate gas from natural gas purification plants and deliver it to downstream customers, such as local utilities. 

The midstream operations are often taken to include some elements of the upstream and downstream sectors. For example, the midstream sector may include natural gas processing plants that purify the raw natural gas as well as removing and producing elemental sulfur and natural gas liquids (NGL) as finished  end-products.

Service providers
 Barge companies
 Railroad companies
 Trucking and hauling companies
 Pipeline transport companies
 Logistics and technology companies
 Transloading companies
 Terminal developers and operators

Midstream in ISO standards
ISO 20815 defines "midstream" in its definition section as: 
3.1.27 midstream 
business category involving the processing and transportation sectors of petroleum industry.

Examples: transportation pipelines, terminals, gas processing and treatment, LNG, LPG, and GTL.

See also 

 Coal bed methane
 Downstream (petroleum industry)
 Extraction of petroleum
 Gas field
 Hydrocarbon exploration
 Natural Gas
 Natural gas condensate
 Natural-gas processing
 Petroleum
 Petroleum extraction
 Oil production plant
 Oil refinery
 Oil well
 Upstream (petroleum industry)

References

External links 
 "NOV — Midstream Page"

Business terms
Petroleum transport
Oil storage
Natural gas
Petroleum industry